40 år med Christer Sjögren is a compilation album by Christer Sjögren, released on 26 March 2008, during his 40th anniversary year as a recording artist. The album consists of recordings from his days as a solo artists, as well as with different bands.

Track listing
I Love Europe
Kan man älska nå'n på avstånd (Vikingarna)
Nyanser (Vikingarna)
Crying in the Moonlight (Månsken i augusti)
Quando quando quando (Pelles)
Bossa Nova Baby
I dina kvarter (Vikingarna)
Till mitt eget Blue Hawaii (Vikingarna)
När du går över floden
Hallelujah (Vikingarna)
Livet går ej i repris (Vikingarna)
Adios adjö
Jag skall gå genom tysta skyar
Suspicious Minds
Glory Glory Hallelujah
Release Me (Vikingarna)
Drei rote Rosen (Die Vikinger)
Love Letters in the Sand (Vikingarna)
Somliga går med trasiga skor
Can You Feel the Love Tonight
Leende guldbruna ögon (Beautiful, Beautiful Brown Eyes, Vikingarna)
Burnin' Love
Vad gör än ett år (Vikingarna)
He's a Rocking Moviestar (Pelles)
Så skimrande var aldrig havet
Liljor (Vikingarna)
Den stora dagen (Vikingarna)
Tårar små tårar (Pelles)
In the Ghetto
Djingis Khan (Vikingarna)
Hallå Västindien (Vikingarna)
Tack och farväl (Vikingarna)
Guldgrävarsången
Ack Värmeland du sköna
Love Me Tender
Ljus och värme (Lys og varme, Vikingarna)
How Great thou art
För dina blåa ögons skull (Vikingarna)
Ol' Man River
Min vän (Jupiters)

Charts

References 

2008 compilation albums
Christer Sjögren albums
Compilation albums by Swedish artists